Senator Kelly may refer to:

Robert Kelly (comics), fictional U.S. Senator appearing in American comic books published by Marvel Comics

Members of the United States Senate 
James K. Kelly (1819–1903), U.S. Senator from Oregon from 1871 to 1877
Mark Kelly (born 1964), U.S. Senator from Arizona since 2020
William Kelly (Alabama politician) (1786–1834), U.S. Senator from Alabama from 1822 to 1825

United States state senate members 
Bernard Kelly (American politician) (1823–?), New York State Senate
David M. Kelly (1841–disappeared 1916), Wisconsin State Senate
Dick M. Kelly (born 1941), South Dakota State Senate
George Bradshaw Kelly (1900–1971), New York State Senate
James A. Kelly Jr. (1926–2013), Massachusetts State Senate
John F. Kelly (Michigan politician) (1949–2018), Michigan State Senate
Joseph D. Kelly (New York City) (1887–1953), New York State Senate
Kate Kelly (politician) (fl. 2000s–2010s), Idaho State Senate
Kevin C. Kelly (fl. 1980s–2010s), Connecticut State Senate
Laura Kelly (born 1950), Kansas State Senate
Molly Kelly (born 1949), New Hampshire State Senate
Morley Garfield Kelly (1892–1956), Wisconsin State Senate, politician and businessman
Percy R. Kelly (1870–1949), Oregon State Senate, attorney and jurist
Pete Kelly (Alaska politician) (born 1956), Alaska State Senate
Randy Kelly (born 1950), Minnesota State Senate
Richard F. Kelly (1936–2015), Illinois State Senate
Scott Kelly (politician) (1927–2005), Florida State Senate
Tim Kelly (Alaska politician) (1944–2009), Alaska State Senate, businessman and politician
William Kelly (New York state senator) (1807–1872), New York State Senate

See also
 Senator Kelley (disambiguation)
 Kelly (disambiguation)
 Eva Kelly Bowring (1892–1985), U.S. Senator from Nebraska in 1954
 Kelly Ayotte (born 1968), U.S. Senator from New Hampshire from 2011 to 2017
 Kelly Loeffler (born 1970), U.S. Senator from Georgia from 2020 to 2021